Chromis okamurai is a species of damselfish native to the northwestern Pacific Ocean off southern Japan.

References

okamurai
Fish described in 1989